The 2023 Hero Super Cup group stage is to be played from 8th to 19th April. A total of 16 teams, consisting of 11 ISL and 5 I-League, compete in the group stage to decide the 4 places in the knockout stage.

Format 
Each group is played in a single round-robin format. The top team advances to the knockout stage.

Tiebreakers 
The teams are ranked according to points (3 points for a win, 1 point for a draw, 0 points for a loss). If tied on points, tiebreakers are applied in the following order:
Points in head-to-head matches among tied teams;
Goal difference in head-to-head matches among tied teams;
Goals scored in head-to-head matches among tied teams;
If more than two teams are tied, and after applying all head-to-head criteria above, a subset of teams are still tied, all head-to-head criteria above are reapplied exclusively to this subset of teams;
Goal difference in all group matches;
Goals scored in all group matches;
Drawing of lots.

Centralised venues 
On 7 March, the AIFF announced that for the first time the tournament would be played in Kerala, across two cities— Kozhikode and Manjeri.

 Group A, C: EMS Stadium
 Group B, D: Payyanad Stadium

Groups

Group A

Matches

Group B

Matches

Group C

Matches

Group D

Matches

References 

Indian Super Cup